Anthylla is an ancient city of Lower Egypt, on the Canopus branch of the Nile river. Herodotus and Athenaeus report that it provided furnishings for the queen of Egypt. It is sometimes thought to be the ancient city of Gynaecopolis.

References

Archaeological sites in Egypt
Former populated places in Egypt